The River Darwen runs through Darwen and Blackburn in Lancashire, England, eventually joining the River Ribble at Walton le Dale south of Preston on its way to the Ribble Estuary.

Course

Originating at Jack's Key Clough where Grain Brook and Grainings Brook meet, the two streams from Bull Hill and Cranberry Moss respectively, the river flows through the town of Darwen, continuing into the suburbs of Blackburn past Ewood Park. The river passes below the Leeds and Liverpool Canal at Ewood Aqueduct and is culverted again at Waterfall and near Griffin Park.  It is joined by the River Blakewater near Witton Country Park in Blackburn and leaves the mostly urban landscapes of the towns behind, flowing through parklands and valleys. A further tributary, the River Roddlesworth, joins the Darwen at the bottom of Moulden Brow on the boundary between Blackburn with Darwen and Chorley Borough Council (the name Moulden Brow being associated with Moulden Water, an alternative name for this stretch of the river).  From there, the Darwen flows past Hoghton Tower through Hoghton Bottoms and Samlesbury Bottoms, finally combining with the River Ribble at Walton-le-Dale.

Places of interest

 A small Memorial Garden for Kathleen Ferrier is on the river bank at Higher Walton, Lancashire.
 Parkway and Higher Croft Woods, south of Blackburn, is a Biological Heritage Site (BHS) which also received a Local Nature Reserve status in 2005
 Walton-le-Dale, location of the Battle of Preston during the Second English Civil War, captured a Parliamentarian army victory in a poem "To Cromwell" by John Milton: -

" While Darwent Streams with Blood of Scots imbru'd..."

The poem names the river "Darwent," giving us evidence of its derivation from a Brythonic dialect form similar to the Old Welsh derwenyd (Modern Welsh derwenydd), meaning "valley thick with oaks".

History

The river was polluted with human and industrial effluent during the Industrial Revolution, and this contamination continued until the early 1970s. The river often changed colour dramatically as a result of paper and paint mills routinely using the river water to flush out dye and paint tanks. This process has now ceased, and as a result the river water is now relatively clear which has resulted in the return of trout and small fish. In 2012 a section of the river which had remained in a culvert for 100 years was uncovered at an area of Darwen known as Shorey Bank. Throughout the course of the river many improvements have resulted in improved water quality.

Tributaries

Hennel Brook
Cockshott Brook
Many Brooks
Black Brook
Hatchwood Brook
Fowler Brook
Drum Head Brook
Gorton Brook
Mill Brook
Bank Head Brook
Old Darwen
Beeston Brook
Quaker Brook
Hole Brook
Huntley Brook (North)
Huntley Brook (South)
Alum House Brook
Arley Brook
Trout Brook
River Roddlesworth
Finnington Brook
Stockclough Brook
Whitehalgh Brook
Shaw Brook
Chapels Brook
Sheep Bridge Brook
Rake Brook
Calf Hey Brook
Ferny Bed Springs
River Blakewater
Snig Brook
Audley Brook
Little Harwood Brook
Royshaw Clough
Seven Acre Brook
Knuzden Brook
Scotshaw Brook
Moss Brook
Badger Brook
Higher Croft Brook
Newfield Brook
Davy Field Brook
Flash Brook
Grimshaw Brook
Waterside Brook
Mean Brook
Sapling Clough
Hoddlesden Moss Brook
Far Scotland Brook
Pickup Bank Brook
Moss Brook
Twitchells Brook
Sunnyhurst Brook
Stepback Brook
Bold Venture Brook
High Lumb Brook
Livesey Brook
Kebbs Brook
Green Lowe Brook
Bury Fold Brook
Old Briggs Brook
Duckshaw Brook
Grainings Brook
Grain Brook
Bent Hall Brook
Deadman's Clough

References

External links
 River Darwen, Cotton Town. Retrieved 19 June 2015.

Rivers of Lancashire
Rivers of Blackburn with Darwen
1Darwen